Kasheh is a village in Kuh Panah Rural District, in the Central District of Tafresh County, Markazi Province, Iran. At the 2006 census, its population was 187, in 59 families.

References 

Populated places in Tafresh County